Beauty and the Boss is a 1932 American pre-Code romantic comedy film directed by Roy Del Ruth and starring Marian Marsh, David Manners and Warren William. It was based on a 1928 Hungarian play by Ladislas Fodor about a secretary who eventually marries her boss. An English language adaptation of the play by Benn Levy, entitled A Church Mouse, opened in London in early May 1931. Another English language adaptation by Frederic and Fanny Hatton, also called A Church Mouse, opened in New York on October 12, 1931.

In 1934 Warner Brothers' British subsidiary remade the story at Teddington Studios as The Church Mouse.

The film's sets were designed by Anton Grot.

Plot summary
An executive hires a mousy, plain woman as his secretary so she will not divert him from his work, but she still becomes determined to win his heart.

Cast
 Marian Marsh as Susie Sachs  
 David Manners as Baron Paul von Ullrich  
 Warren William as Baron Josef von Ullrich  
 Charles Butterworth as Ludwig Pfeffer Jr.  
 Frederick Kerr as Count Von Tolheim  
 Mary Doran as Olive 'Ollie' Frey  
 Robert Greig as Chappel 
 Lilian Bond as Girl at Bar
 Yola d'Avril as Girl in Bath Tub  
 Harry Holman as Hotel Manager  
 Olaf Hytten as Business Associate  
 Barbara Leonard as Girl With Dog  
 Polly Walters as Ludwig's Girl  
 Leo White as Man in Elevator

References

Bibliography
 Dick, Bernard F. The Merchant Prince of Poverty Row: Harry Cohn of Columbia Pictures. University Press of Kentucky.

External links
 
 
 
 

1932 films
1932 romantic comedy films
1930s English-language films
American romantic comedy films
Films directed by Roy Del Ruth
American black-and-white films
Warner Bros. films
American films based on plays
1930s American films